American Samoa competed at the 2004 Summer Olympics in Athens, Greece from 13 to 29 August 2004.

Athletics 

American Samoan athletes have so far achieved qualifying standards in the following athletics events (up to a maximum of 3 athletes in each event at the 'A' Standard, and 1 at the 'B' Standard). 

Men
Track & road events

Women
Field events

Key
Note–Ranks given for track events are within the athlete's heat only
Q = Qualified for the next round
q = Qualified for the next round as a fastest loser or, in field events, by position without achieving the qualifying target
NR = National record
N/A = Round not applicable for the event
Bye = Athlete not required to compete in round

Weightlifting

References

External links
Official Report of the XXVIII Olympiad

Nations at the 2004 Summer Olympics
2004
Olympics